LloydsPharmacy is a British pharmacy company. It has around 17,000 staff and dispenses over 150 million prescription items annually. It is owned by the Aurelius Group. It was formerly owned by the American McKesson Corporation.

Overview
The company is headquartered at Sapphire Court in the Walsgrave Triangle Business Park in Coventry, England. It was purchased by Celesio AG in 1997, and was merged with Celesio's existing UK subsidiary AAH Pharmaceuticals' Hills Pharmacy network to form a network of 1300 pharmacies. In 2022 it was purchased by the Aurelius Group.

McKesson has since begun to roll out the LloydsPharmacy brand across its 2,200 European pharmacies. These pharmacies include a "Health Bar", with interactive touch screens, consulting rooms and additional health advice.

A close association with Diabetes UK has developed due to LloydsPharmacy completing more than 2 million [free in-pharmacy] diabetes tests so far in the UK.

LloydsPharmacy used to broadcast a live radio station (LloydsPharmacy Live!) within its stores; presenters included ex-BBC Radio broadcaster Bruno Brookes. This radio station was shut down on 29 February 2012 to cut costs.

In 2020—2021 revenue from its online pharmacy LloydsDirect was 731% more than the previous year, though there was a 9.6% decrease in turnover for the company as a whole. In March 2021, there were 1,351 LloydsPharmacy branches, decreased from 1,427 in 2020.

History

Lloyds Chemist began in 1973 when Allen Lloyd purchased his first pharmacy in Polesworth, Warwickshire, England, UK. It is estimated he made a £32 million fortune from the LloydsPharmacy empire.

In November 2013 the Daily Telegraph reported that "The prices of more than 20,000 drugs could have been artificially inflated, with backhanders paid to chemists who agreed to sell them". In particular it was alleged that Lloyds was charging the NHS £89.50 for packets of cod liver oil, when other suppliers could provide it for £3.15. NHS Protect had mounted an investigation.

In December 2013 it was involved in a case where Quantum Pharmaceutical was fined more than £380,000 by the Office of Fair Trading over a cartel arrangement in which it carved up some of a multimillion-pound market in prescription drugs for care homes with Lloyds Pharmacy.  Lloyds brought the case to the attention of the OFT so is not expected to pay a fine.

In July 2015, Lloyd's announced the purchase of all 281 Sainsbury's pharmacies for £125 million in a deal that transferred all 2500 Sainsbury's pharmacy employees to the company. In December 2015 the sale was referred to the Competition and Markets Authority for investigation. The deal was approved and the stores have been rebranded as Lloyds. With the addition of Sainsbury’s pharmacies, there were around 1800 LloydsPharmacy branches around the UK, employing more than 19,000 people.  In October 2017 Lloyds announced that it would close or sell 190 of its 1,600 shops in England and to expand its use of digital channels.

Lloyds made a €12 million settlement to the Irish Health Service Executive (HSE) over a dispute of phased dispensing to medical card holders. Lloyds put a patient’s monthly medication into four separate trays, one for each seven-day period. The drugs were supplied to the patient in a single visit. This boosted Lloyds income by up to €600 per year for each medical card holder.

In June 2019, Lloyds acquired Echo, an online prescription fulfilment business in the UK, for an undisclosed sum.

See also
List of pharmacies

References

External links
 

Pharmacies of the United Kingdom
Pharmacy brands
British companies established in 1973
Retail companies established in 1973
1997 mergers and acquisitions